Im Chul-soo (born August 22, 1984), is a South Korean actor. He is well-known for his supporting roles in a number of popular Korean dramas.

Filmography

Films

Television series

Web series

Theater

Awards and nominations

References

External links
 Im Chul-soo at HighZium Studio

1984 births
Living people
South Korean male film actors
South Korean male television actors
21st-century South Korean male actors
South Korean male web series actors